The Namaqua thick-toed gecko (Pachydactylus namaquensis) is a species of lizard in the family Gekkonidae. It is found in Namibia and South Africa.

References

Pachydactylus
Geckos of Africa
Reptiles of Namibia
Reptiles of South Africa
Reptiles described in 1898
Taxa named by Philip Sclater